The following is a list of cities in Iran that have undergone a name change in the recent past. Many more however have at least one Ancient and/or other historical name(s).

See also
 List of city name changes (worldwide, by country)
 List of renamed cities in Armenia
 List of renamed cities in Georgia

Cities
Iran, Renamed
Iran geography-related lists
Iran